8013 Gordonmoore, provisional designation , is an eccentric, stony asteroid and near-Earth object of the  Apollo group, approximately 1–2 kilometers in diameter.

The asteroid was discovered on 18 May 1990, by American astronomer Eleanor Helin at Palomar Observatory in California, United States. It was named after Intel co-founder Gordon Moore.

Orbit and classification 

Gordonmoore orbits the Sun at a distance of 1.3–3.1 AU once every 3 years and 3 months (1,192 days). Its orbit has an eccentricity of 0.43 and an inclination of 8° with respect to the ecliptic.

Due to its eccentric orbit, Gordonmoore is also Mars-crosser. In 2127, the asteroid will pass the Red Planet within .

A first precovery was taken at the discovering Palomar Observatory in 1951, extending the body's observation arc by 39 years prior to its official discovery observation.

Physical characteristics

Rotation period 

In April 2016, a rotational lightcurve of Gordonmoore was obtained from photometric observations by astronomer Brian Warner at the Palmer Divide Station in Colorado. It gave a rotation period of  hours with a brightness variation of 0.25 magnitude. Lightcurve analysis also gave an alternative period solution of 4.19 hours with an amplitude of 0.25 magnitude.. The results supersede a previous observations made at the Hoher List Observatory in Germany, that gave a shorter period of 6 hours.

Diameter and albedo 

The Collaborative Asteroid Lightcurve Link assumes a standard albedo for stony asteroids of 0.20 and calculates a diameter of 1.04 kilometers with an absolute magnitude of 17.26. In the 1990s, Tom Gehrels estimated the body's diameter to be 2.3 kilometers, assuming an albedo of 0.15.

Naming 

This minor planet was named in honour of American entrepreneur and billionaire, Gordon Moore (born 1929), co-founder of Intel, known for his revolutionary vision of the future of computers, and author of Moore's law. As a philanthropist, Moore has supported research and education all his life. The official naming citation was published by the Minor Planet Center on 26 May 2002.

References

External links 
 Hazards due to Comets and Asteroids (1994)
 Asteroid Lightcurve Database (LCDB), query form (info )
 Dictionary of Minor Planet Names, Google books
 Asteroids and comets rotation curves, CdR – Observatoire de Genève, Raoul Behrend
 
 
 

008013
Discoveries by Eleanor F. Helin
Named minor planets
19900518